Oğuzhan Berber (born 10 April 1992) is a Turkish professional footballer who plays as a left-back for Süper Lig club İstanbulspor.

Professional career
Berber is a product of the youth academies of Karşıyaka and Denizlispor, and began his senior career with Denizlispor in 2011. He shortly after went on loan to Sarayköy until the end of the 2011-12 season. He transferred to Çaykur Rizespor in 2013. He made his professional debut with Rizespor in a 1-1 Süper Lig tie with Kayseri Erciyesspor on 2 November 2014. From Rizespor, he had successive loans at Adana Demirspor, Altınordu and Samsunspor, before a short stint with in 2016.

On 16 June 2017 Berber signed with Kayserispor. He joined İstanbulspor on loan in 2017, and after good performances with them was signed permanently in 2018. He had a short stint with Boluspor for the 2020-21 season, before returning to İstanbulspor. He helped İstanbulspor achieve promotion in the 2021-22 season for the first time in 17 years. He started in İstanbulspor return to the Süper Lig in a 2–0 season opening loss to Trabzonspor on 5 August 2022.

International career
Berber is a youth international for Turkey, having played for the Turkey U21 and A2 teams.

References

External links
 
 
 
 Istanbulspor Profile
 Kayserispor Profile

1992 births
Living people
People from Konak
Turkish footballers
Turkey B international footballers
Turkey under-21 international footballers
Denizlispor footballers
Çaykur Rizespor footballers
Adana Demirspor footballers
Samsunspor footballers
Kayserispor footballers
İstanbulspor footballers
Süper Lig players
TFF First League players
TFF Second League players
Association football fullbacks